The Australian Bird Study Association (ABSA) was first formed as the Bird Banders Association in 1962 of a group of people interested in bird-banding and other aspects of field ornithology in Australia.

Since its inception, it has published a journal.  Originally entitled Australian Bird Bander, the journal has been published under the title Corella since 1977.

External links
 

Ornithological organisations in Australia
1962 establishments in Australia